Nair Saab is a 1989 Malayalam language  action thriller film, written by Dennis Joseph and directed by Joshiy and produced by Liberty Productions. It stars Mammootty, Suresh Gopi, Mukesh and Geetha. It was released on the occasion of Onam. Nair Saab was one of the biggest blockbusters of Mammootty's career and established his super stardom

Plot 
A new batch of trainees arrives at the army training center (SAT) situated near the border in Kashmir. Their trainer is Major Nair, who is a man known for his hard-and-fast training strategies. The  movie is treated with humour arising from the intense training of the guys. But, things take a U-turn when the underworld led by Kumar buys out two guys from the batch and uses them for importing drugs from the neighboring country, which is hinted as Pakistan (though never mentioned in the movie).

In the turn of events, one trainee, Antony is killed by the hands of underworld, while the blame falls on the trainer, Nair. Everybody turns against Nair and he has to flee, only to come back later. The plot thickens as well with the arrival of a smuggler and partner of Kumar, James as the new trainer, Major Nambiar for SAT with the intention to sell the ammunition stored there, which is worth millions, to the enemy state. Nair intervenes at the right time and with the help of his students, spoils all the evil plans of the traitors.

Cast 
Mammootty as Major Ravindran Nair
Suresh Gopi as Cadet Gopakumar
Mukesh as Cadet Antony
Geetha as  Savitri/Radha
Sumalatha as Prabha
Lizy as Parvathi
Vijayaraghavan as Cadet Rishi
Mohan Jose as Cadet Joseph
K. B. Ganesh Kumar as Cadet Ganeshan
Siddique as Cadet Siddique
Maniyanpilla Raju as Cadet Chandran Pillai
Kunchan as Cadet Mohan
Devan as Kumar
Lalu Alex as James/A. K. K. Nambiar
Jagannatha Varma  as Brigadier Varma
Azeez as Devayya
Mamukkoya as Chef Koya

Release 
The film was released on 8 September 1989.

Box office 
The film was commercial success.

Music 
The film had a successful soundtrack composed by S. P. Venkatesh, with lyrics by Shibu Chakravarthy.

"Hey Giridharane" – Vani Jairam
"Pazhayoru Paattile" – Sujatha Mohan, M. G. Sreekumar
"Punchavayalu" – M. G. Sreekumar

References

External links 
 

1980s Malayalam-language films
1989 films
Films about terrorism in India
Indian Army in films
Films directed by Joshiy